Rebbe: The Life and Teachings of Menachem M. Schneerson, the Most Influential Rabbi in Modern History is a biography of Rabbi Menachem Mendel Schneerson authored by Joseph Telushkin and published in 2014.

Development 
When asked why he chose to write this book, Telushkin said "I can think of no oth­er rab­bi who is as familiar to Jews in Israel, the U.S., the former Sovi­et Union, and France - the four most populous Jewish communities in the world today. So it certainly seemed  that this was a man whose life deserved to be studied in depth."

Critical reception
The book received positive reviews from The Wall Street Journal,  NY1, The Forward,  and Booklist.

Rankings
New York Times bestseller (Hardcover Nonfiction, 2014)
Reuters bestseller (Hardcover Nonfiction, 2014)

References

2014 non-fiction books
American biographies
HarperCollins books